Kevin Vance Hernández Kirkconnell (born 21 December 1985) is a Honduran football goalkeeper who currently plays for Platense in the Liga Nacional de Fútbol de Honduras.

Club career
He began his career in 2003 with Club Victoria before moving abroad to join Uruguayan side Bella Vista. He moved to fellow Uruguayan outfit Central Español before the 2009 Clausura.

International career
He is also part of the U-23 squad that are the Pre-Olympic champions of CONCACAF 2008 where he was voted best goalkeeper of the competition. He made his debut for the national side on 22 May 2008 in a friendly against Belize and earned his second and so far last cap in the same year against Haiti. He has represented his country at the 2008 Summer Olympics.

References

External links

 Profile - Real Espana

1985 births
Living people
People from Islas de la Bahía Department
Association football goalkeepers
Honduran footballers
Honduras international footballers
Footballers at the 2008 Summer Olympics
Olympic footballers of Honduras
C.D. Victoria players
C.A. Bella Vista players
Central Español players
Real C.D. España players
Platense F.C. players
Honduran expatriate footballers
Expatriate footballers in Uruguay
Liga Nacional de Fútbol Profesional de Honduras players
Uruguayan Primera División players
2013 Copa Centroamericana players
2013 CONCACAF Gold Cup players
2014 Copa Centroamericana players